Eddie Boros (November 27, 1932 – April 27, 2007) was a New York City house painter and artist, famous primarily for building the "Tower of Toys" in a community garden in Manhattan's East Village.

Biography
Boros was born in New York on November 27, 1932, as the middle son of two Hungarian immigrants, a house painter and a seamstress. He grew up in the same apartment, on East 5th St. and Avenue B, that he was living in when he died. His rent, in 2007, was $68.00.

Boros served in the U.S. Army during the Korean War, but was such an adamant pacifist that he was assigned to tree planting.

He began building his tower out of scrap wood in 1985, after installing carving wood sculptures randomly around the 6th Street and Avenue B Community Garden he was asked by the other community gardeners to restrain his installations only to his own plot. In 1994 Eddie's documentary directed by Jimmy Dougherty premiered nationally on PBS television stations. Over time, the tower grew to a height of 65 ft, and was otherwise notable for being covered with a variety of toys. The tower appeared in the opening credits for the television show NYPD Blue and also appears in the musical RENT.

Boros died at the age of 74 while recuperating after having both legs amputated above the knee. He died at Mary Immaculate Hospital after his relatives allegedly found him to be malnourished at the VA hospital he had been sent to in St. Albans, Queens.

Part of the 12th Annual Lower East Side Festival for the Arts was dedicated to Eddie Boros' memory.

In July 2011, a play entitled "Tower of Toys," written and directed by New York playwright Jackob G. Hofmann was presented at the Lion Theatre, NYC as a part of Samuel French's annual short play festival.

Notes

External links
6th & B Garden

Artists from New York City
House painters
Sculptors from New York (state)
People from the East Village, Manhattan
1932 births
2007 deaths